Ambassador Eniola Olaitan Ajayi (born 18 January 1965) is a Nigerian politician and diplomat currently serving as Nigerian ambassador to Hungary with concurrent accreditation to Serbia, Croatia, and Bosnia and Herzegovina. She was recently reassigned to serve as Nigerian ambassador to Netherlands by President Muhammadu Buhari.

Background
Ajayi was born on 18 January 1965 in Ipoti Ekiti to the family of Late Pa Oluwatoyin Owolabi Ajayi of Iyin Ekiti and Chief Mrs. Elizabeth Anike Ajayi of Ipoti Ekiti. Her early life began at St George’s Anglican Primary School, Ijero Ekiti before proceeding to Emmanuel Anglican Primary School, Ado Ekiti. She had her secondary education at Christ’s School, Ado – Ekiti. She earned a Bachelor of Science in Optometry in 1986 from the University of Benin. Following her graduation, she served in the National Youth Service Corps at the Eye Clinic of the Nigerian Airforce. On completion of her one year service, she was retained as permanent staff of the clinic and she worked there until she got a study leave to do a research at the Institute of Ophthalmology, University of London. In 1994, she earned her Master of Philosophy in Ocular Pathology from the same university. She returned to Nigeria and continued her work at the Nigeria Airforce until 1997 when she started her private practice. She later returned to University of Benin where she earned Doctor of Optometry in 2000. 

She is a motivator and a Minister of God in her local assembly – Daystar Christian centre; catering to the well-being of Couples believing God for children and those who are already pregnant. Dr Eniola AJAYI is married to Adegboyega Oke and she is a mother to many children.

Political career
Ajayi came to political limelight after her first term as Commissioner for Education, Science and Technology in Ekiti state of Nigeria where she implemented landmark reforms in the education sector. She was later appointed the Commissioner for Environments.

Commissioner for Education, Science and Technology
As commissioner for education in Ekiti from December 2010 till January 2013, Ajayi worked with the team of Governor Kayode Fayemi to actualize his 8-point agenda. She superintended the merger of the three universities at the time to the new and virile Ekiti State University. It was also under her leadership that the law establishing the College of Education, Ikere Ekiti was re-enacted.

Commissioner for Environment
Ajayi also served as commissioner for Environment from February 2013 till October 2015. Under this role, she spearheaded the efforts to reduce illegal felling of trees, achieve forest regeneration and improved internally generated revenue through Forestry activities. She also commenced the establishment of Forestry Commission for proper administration of the Forest through inclusive engagement of all the Forestry Stakeholders in Ekiti State.

Diplomatic career
Ajayi began her diplomatic career following her appointment by President Muhammadu Buhari and subsequent assignment to Hungary as Nigerian ambassador. She served as Nigerian ambassador to Hungary with concurrent accreditation to Serbia, Croatia, Bosnia and Herzegovina, until her recent reassignment to the Netherlands.

References 

1965 births
Living people
Political office-holders in Nigeria
Ambassadors of Nigeria to Hungary
Ambassadors of Nigeria to the Netherlands